Megas Alexandros Karperi F.C. is a Greek football club, based in Karperi, Serres, Greece

Honors

Domestic Titles and honors

 Serres FCA Champion: 1
 2016-17

References

Football clubs in Central Macedonia
Serres
Association football clubs established in 1949
1949 establishments in Greece
Gamma Ethniki clubs